"Another World" is the first single by British DJ and singer Sonique to be released from her On Kosmo album. Released as a CD single in Austria, Germany and Switzerland on 13 December 2004, the track peaked at number 57 in Germany.

The track was a collaboration with German producer and DJ Tomcraft, and was a major success in the nightclub scene. The song was released under the artist name "Sonique on Tomcraft".

Music video
The music video for the song was produced by Designliga (Design League) of Munich. Backgrounds and many other elements are computer-generated static (stationary) and motion graphics, some reminiscent of the movie Tron. Live-action shots of Sonique and her pursuer (who was multiplied into several through graphics) were done in front of a green screen, and composited with the CGI backgrounds.

Track listing
"Another World" is a remix CD single containing five versions of the song:
"Another World" (Video edit)
"Another World" (Club radio edit)
"Another World" (Extended club mix)
"Another World" (Matthew Bradley presents Mashtronic Remix)
"Another World" (Video)

Charts

References

External links
Sonique fanpage on Another World

2004 singles
2004 songs
Sonique (musician) songs
Tomcraft songs
Bertelsmann Music Group singles